Pasałka  is a settlement in the administrative district of Gmina Łagów, within Świebodzin County, Lubusz Voivodeship, in western Poland.

The settlement has a population of 9.

References

Villages in Świebodzin County